Florence Randle was a Works Progress Administration photographer who traveled with her teenage niece (Phyllis Sheffield) to photograph Miccosukee in South Florida around 1937. Randle is survived by her niece, who works as a painter and sels the acclaimed documentary photographs they made together.

Jeff Klinkenberg wrote about their work and it has been displayed at the Smithsonian and in Seminole collections. Her work is also in the P.K. Yonge Library of Florida History and the collections of the South Florida Archaeology and Ethnography Program at the Florida Museum of Natural History in Gainesville, Florida. Their work is also included in the Phyllis Sheffield Collection at the Department of Anthropology & Genealogy, Seminole Tribe of Florida.

Sheffield continues to sell their work along with her own paintings.

References

American photographers
American women photographers